The Chowchilla River is a river in central California, United States and a minor tributary of the San Joaquin River.

Most of the lower half of the river forms the border between Merced and Madera County.

Course
The river begins as three separate forks in southern Mariposa County.

West Fork
The West Fork (officially known as West Fork Chowchilla River) is formed by the confluence of Jones Creek and Snow Creek, north of the town of Bootjack, California. It flows roughly south from Bootjack, receiving Pegleg Creek, Humbug Creek, Italian Creek and Blade Creek before converging with the Middle Fork.

Middle Fork
The Middle Fork (officially known as Middle Fork Chowchilla River) is formed by the confluence of Magoon Creek and Fox Creek, on the east side of Magoon Hill in the Sierra Nevada. It flows roughly south along the west side of Stumpfield Mountain, receiving a few unnamed tributaries, before converging with the West Fork.

East Fork
The East Fork (officially known as East Fork Chowchilla River) is the longest of the three forks and is formed by the confluence of several small, unnamed streams on the south side of Chowchilla Mountain, in the Sierra National Forest. It flows roughly south past the locality of Harris Ranch, receiving Oliver Creek and several other small, unnamed tributaries along the way. It converges with the West Fork south of Bailey Flats, and a few miles south of where the Middle and West Forks converge.

Main river
The Chowchilla River begins in name at the point where the West and East forks converge and flows southwest to Eastman Lake. The lake and dam's primary purpose is flood control and irrigation. In the summer months, Eastman Lake is a popular boating, fishing, camping and hiking destination for residents of the Madera and Chowchilla areas.

Below Eastman Lake, the river continues roughly west, past the City of Chowchilla, to the San Joaquin River System.

Lower river
Seven miles downstream of Eastman Lake, the Chowchilla's water is diverted into both the Berenda and Ash sloughs, with excess water continuing down the main river channel.  The river flows west-southwest for most of the rest of the journey before flowing west in the last few miles.  The last  of the river doubles as an irrigation canal for farms located along its banks.

The river has never had a defined natural outlet to the San Joaquin, as evidenced by the fact that the riverbed shrinks considerably in size as it travels west. A natural outlet never existed because the river only has a seasonal flow, and natural water flow would normally dry up before it had a chance to reach the San Joaquin. In rare years of torrential rains, there would still be water in the river at the end of the riverbed, at which point the water would simply flood the area past the end of the riverbed. Those floodwaters would eventually find their way into the San Joaquin River.

As part of the Lower San Joaquin River Flood Control Project, a diversion canal was built to connect the end of the riverbed with the Eastside Bypass, allowing the Chowchilla's water a controlled outlet to the San Joaquin River during years of heavy rains.

The Chowchilla River serves at the outlet of the Madera Canal.

Tributaries
In addition to many small unnamed streams, the Chowchilla River receives the water from the following streams:
Rock Creek
Willow Creek
Split Rock Creek
Cow Creek

Towns
Towns along the Chowchilla River include:
Harris Ranch (Unincorporated)
Bootjack (Unincorporated)
Raymond (Unincorporated)
Chowchilla

Crossings
There are numerous crossings over the Chowchilla River in Madera and Merced Counties.  Crossings are listed here beginning at the source and working downstream:
Madera County above Eastman Lake
Bailey Flats Road
Green Mountain Road
Madera County below Eastman Lake
Eastman Lake Park Access Road
Santa Fe Drive
Santa Fe Railroad next to Santa Fe Drive crossing
Road 19
Road 15
State Route 99
Road 13
Avenue 26
Road 11
Hemlock Road
Road 8
Avenue 25
Road 5½
Road 5
Merced County
South Orchard Way
State Route 59

See also
List of rivers of California

References

External links
Wildernet - Eastman Lake
San Joaquin River White Paper

Rivers of the Sierra Nevada (United States)
Tributaries of the San Joaquin River
Rivers of Mariposa County, California
Rivers of Madera County, California
Rivers of Merced County, California
Geography of the San Joaquin Valley
Central Valley Project
Chowchilla, California
Rivers of Northern California
Rivers of the Sierra Nevada in California